CamGlen Radio  is a local radio station based in Rutherglen, South Lanarkshire, Scotland. It started broadcasting a full-time service on 19 March 2015.

The station plays both modern and older songs. It broadcasts on 107.9 FM to Rutherglen, Cambuslang and the surrounding area in South-East Glasgow and South Lanarkshire. It is also available through Wi-Fi radio and the internet.

History

After the concept for the station came about in 2004-2005, the station first broadcast via a Restricted Service Licence in May 2007. Subsequently, it would complete eleven other short term broadcasts, during which planning for a full-time application began.

Having submitted a 27-page application on 13 Feb 2012, it was announced on 20 July of the same year that it had been awarded a community radio licence for full-time broadcasting The RSL broadcasts continued while preparation for the full-time licence began 

The full-time launch was originally planned for 17 Jul 2014, but was delayed when a £436,000 grant was made available to Healthy n Happy (their parent organisation), to refurbish their base in the former church hall at 18 Farmeloan Road, Rutherglen. As a result, they launched eight months later than planned from temporary accommodation in Unit 10 of the next-door Aspire Building. The refurbishment of "Number 18" as a community hub including purpose-built studios was completed later than scheduled, and they ultimately took possession of their permanent home on the second floor of Number 18 on 7 Sep 2015, and began broadcast from there five days later. Upon the formal opening of the building on 9 Oct 2015, the launch party featuring local bands was broadcast live on CamGlen

Programming
Based within the coverage area, CamGlen's licence requires daytime output typically comprising a 3:1 music/speech mix, with a varied musical output in the evenings. 90% of output must be locally produced, and the station must broadcast locally-produced output for a minimum of thirteen hours a day, of which eight hours must be original, non-repeat content.

References

External links

CamGlen Radio on TuneIn
CamGlen Radio on Mixcloud

CamGlen Radio Airplay Chart

Community radio stations in the United Kingdom
Cambuslang
Rutherglen
Radio stations in Scotland